Tegula  can mean:

 Teulada, Italy, called Tegula during Roman times

Tegula, plural tegulae is in origin the Latin word for "tile" and may refer to:
 Tegula (gastropod), a genus of marine snails
 Tegula (insect anatomy), a part of the wings attached to the mesothorax, in various insects
 Tegula (primate anatomy), claw-like nails found in New World monkeys
 Imbrex and tegula, interlocking roofing tiles used in ancient Greek and Roman architecture